The Singapore FA Cup, (also known as the Singapore Pools FA Cup for sponsorship reasons), is an annual football competition in Singapore.

Initially held for clubs from the S.League from 1996-1998, the Football Association of Singapore decided to change format of the cup to allow only teams from National Football League to take part in the knock out competition from 1999,
so that the S.League clubs can focus on Singapore Cup, competition created in 1998.

After the Singapore Cup and earlier League Cup, Singapore FA Cup is the next major cup competition in Singapore. For a number of years, the FA Cup was solely restricted to NFL clubs. In 2006, S.League clubs were once again allowed in the competition, but were only permitted to field their developmental Prime League teams. The team matchups were drawn out of a hat against one another for the initial 2006 and 2007 seasons, before being seeded into two groups since 2008.

Results

Note: 
Tampines Rovers SC is a separate entity from Tampines Rovers.
SAFSA is a separate entity from Singapore Armed Forces.
Police SA is a separate entity from Home United (formerly Police FC).

References

See also
 Singapore Cup 2010
 Singapore Premier League
 Singapore League Cup
 Singapore Community Shield
 Football Association of Singapore
 List of football clubs in Singapore

National association football cups
Cup